Green River Killer is a 2005 American crime film by Ulli Lommel starring George Kiseleff, Jaquelyn Aurora (as Jacquelyn Horrell), Georgina Donovan, Shannon Leade, Naidra Dawn Thomson, and Shawn G. Smith. It is based upon the crimes of serial killer Gary Ridgway.

Plot
Based on the true story of serial murderer Gary Ridgway, the film depicts how he would approach prostitutes in bars, take them to his homes, brutally kill them and throw the corpses into the Green River, a pattern of behavior which explains his sobriquet, "Green River Killer."  Soon, however, the police are on his track.

Cast
George Kiseleff – Gary Ridgway
Jaquelyn Aurora – Hedy 
Georgina Donovan
Shannon Leade – Anna
Naidra Dawn Thomson – Irene
Shawn G. Smith – Coworker #1
Kimko – Coworker #2
Sebastien Szumilas – Kevin 
Bud Watson – Defense Attorney
Carsten Frank – Boris

Filming

The documentary footage is of the real Gary Ridgway confessing to the killings.

The flashback of Ridgway's fictional "mentor," Boris, has a distinctly different look and atmosphere compared with the rest of the movie. That is because the footage was not shot by director Ulli Lommel but by German actor-director "Marian Dora," a pseudonym for the physician who began making gory horror films around the same time Lommel directed Green River Killer. Dora made Cannibal – Aus dem Tagebuch des Kannibalen, for example. Dora, who also worked on Lommel's Zombie Nation, in this flashback directs actor Carsten Frank as he strangles a woman.

Green River Killer was the second in a series of direct-to-DVD titles directed by Lommel and released by Lions Gate Entertainment under its Artisan label. The first was Zodiac Killer (2005). Green River Killer would soon to be followed by BTK Killer (2005) and Killer Pickton (2005). Other direct-to-DVD movies directed by Lommel and featuring serial killers would follow in 2007 and 2008.

Ridgway's home in the movie, which is a residence located in Marina del Rey, California, was also the house inhabited by "Producer McCoon" in Black Dahlia (2006).

References

External links

2005 films
2005 horror films
2000s biographical films
2005 crime thriller films
American crime thriller films
American horror thriller films
Biographical films about serial killers
Films directed by Ulli Lommel
Films set in Washington (state)
Films shot in California
Films shot in Los Angeles
Cultural depictions of male serial killers
Cultural depictions of American men
Cultural depictions of rapists
Films scored by Robert J. Walsh
American serial killer films
2000s English-language films
2000s American films